Andrew John Corbett (born 20 February 1982) is an English former footballer. He was part of the Kidderminster Harriers youth system but found first team opportunities limited to seven appearances in the Football League, and moved to Solihull Borough. At Solihull he was a prolific striker and earned a move to Nuneaton Borough. After just a few months at Nuneaton, Burton Albion secured his signature for a small fee. Corbett joined the Brewers as a striker but has found more success at right back and right midfield, and won the club's Player of the Season award in 2005.

Corbett was part of the 2008/2009 Conference National winning squad and signed a new deal with the club in May 2009.

Career statistics

Honours
Conference National: 2009

References

External links

1982 births
Living people
Sportspeople from Worcester, England
English footballers
Association football midfielders
Kidderminster Harriers F.C. players
Solihull Borough F.C. players
Nuneaton Borough F.C. players
Burton Albion F.C. players
Hereford United F.C. players
English Football League players
Southern Football League players
National League (English football) players